Suhr can refer to:

People
 Johannes Nicolaus von Suhr (1792–1847), botanist with the standard author abbreviation "Suhr"

Denmark
Suhr family
 Johan Peter Suhr, Danish merchant and founder of J.P. Suhr & Søn
 Johannes Theodorus Suhr (1792–1860), Danish merchant and industrialist
 Johannes Theodor Suhr (1896–1997), Danish bishop
 Alex Suhr (1898–1954), Danish actor
 August Suhr (1893–1958), Danish boxer

Germany
 Otto Suhr (1894–1957), former mayor of West Berlin

UK
 Marianne Suhr, English surveyor

US
 Anna Wallace Suhr, the voice of Seoul City Sue, a North Korean radio propagandist
 Brendan Suhr, US basketball director
 Gus Suhr (1906–2004), US baseball player
 Jenn Suhr, (born 1982), US pole vaulter
 Rick Suhr, a pole-vaulting coach and founder of Suhr Sports
 Trish Suhr (born 1974), US comedian

Places
 Suhr, Aargau, a municipality of Switzerland
 Suhr railway station

Other
 Suhr Guitars, a California-based guitar manufacturer
 Suhr House, building in Copenhagen
 Society for Underwater Historical Research (SUHR), an amateur maritime archaeology organisation based in South Australia

See also
 Suhre, a river of Switzerland, rising in Lake Sempach

Low German surnames
Danish-language surnames
Occupational surnames